The 1974 Rhode Island gubernatorial election was held on November 5, 1974. Incumbent Democrat Philip Noel defeated Republican nominee James W. Nugent with 78.48% of the vote.

General election

Candidates
Philip Noel, Democratic
James W. Nugent, Republican

Results

References

1974
Rhode Island
Gubernatorial